Syllitus timorensis is a species of beetle in the family Cerambycidae. It was described by Gilmour in 1961.

References

Stenoderini
Beetles described in 1961